Poa, Burkina Faso may refer to:

 Poa, Bazèga, Burkina Faso
 Poa, Boulkiemdé, Burkina Faso